The Celier XeWing (contraction of Xenon Wing) is a Polish ultralight aircraft that was designed by Frenchman Raphael Celier and produced by his company Celier Aviation of Jaktorów-Kolonia, Poland. It was introduced at AERO Friedrichshafen in 2009. The aircraft was intended to be supplied as a kit for amateur construction or as a complete ready-to-fly-aircraft.

By 2012 the company was no longer advertising the XeWing and it is unlikely that it progressed beyond the prototype stage.

Design and development
The XeWing was developed by mating the fuselage from the Celier Xenon 2 gyroplane with a newly designed strut-braced parasol wing in place of the rotor system. The aircraft was intended to comply with the Fédération Aéronautique Internationale microlight rules. It features a two-seats-in-side-by-side configuration enclosed cockpit, fixed tricycle landing gear and a single engine in pusher configuration.

The wing can be folded for ground transportation and storage. The standard engine specified was the  Rotax 912ULS four-stroke powerplant.

Despite the commonality of the fuselage and engine package with the Xenon 2, the XeWing cannot swap its fixed wing for a rotor system.

Specifications (XeWing)

References

2000s Polish ultralight aircraft
Homebuilt aircraft
Single-engined pusher aircraft
High-wing aircraft
Twin-boom aircraft